Evert "Eddy" Koops (2 January 1885 – 10 November 1938) was a Dutch athlete.  He competed at the 1908 Summer Olympics in London. He was born and died in Arnhem.

In the 100 metres, Koops placed fourth of four in his first round heat resulting in his elimination from the competition. The next day, he did the same in his preliminary heat of the Men's 200 metres. In the 400 metre hurdles competition he was eliminated in the semi-finals. He also participated in the standing long jump event but his result is unknown.

He was also a member of the Dutch relay team which was eliminated in the first round of the medley contest.

References

Sources
 
 
 
 Heere, A. and Kappenburg, B. (2000) 1870 – 2000, 130 jaar atletiek in Nederland. Groenevelt b.v.
 Bijkerk, T. (2004) Olympisch Oranje. De Vrieseborch

1885 births
1938 deaths
Dutch male sprinters
Dutch male long jumpers
Athletes (track and field) at the 1908 Summer Olympics
Olympic athletes of the Netherlands
Sportspeople from Arnhem
20th-century Dutch people